Clypeaster euclastus is a species of sea urchins of the Family Clypeasteridae. Their armour is covered with spines. Clypeaster euclastus was first scientifically described in 1941 by Hubert Lyman Clark.

References 

Animals described in 1941
Clypeaster